There's Always a Way to Find a Way is a Quebecois film directed by Denis Héroux and with a scenario by Marcel Lefebvre with input from Héroux, Guy Fournier, Gilles Gauthier, and Jean-Guy Moreau; it was released in 1973.

Plot summary
A Quebec comedy about an ordinary man (Jean-Guy Moreau) and his overly active and imaginative brother-in-law (Willie Lamothe) who tells a lie about why he was late coming in to his bank-teller job. One thing leads to another, and confusion and mayhem are unleashed. An early film role for Quebec singing star Dominique Michel, who had a hit with the film's title song released as a duet with Lamothe.

Cast
 Jean-Guy Moreau : Sam
 Yvan Ducharme : Yvan
 Willie Lamothe : Willie Turgeon
 Dominique Michel : The Mother Superior
 Danielle Ouimet : Marie
 Denise Pelletier
 Gilles Latulippe
 Roger Garand
 Aglaë
 Paul Berval
 Clémence DesRochers
 André Gagnon
 Benoît Marleau
 Paolo Noël
 Céline Bernier
 Jacques Bouchard
 Claude-Jean Devirieux
 Robert Desroches
 Marcel Fournier
 Robert Gillet
 Toto Gingras
 Raymond Guilbeault
 Nettie Harris
 Gaétan Lafrance
 Jacques Morency
 Diane Noël
 Fernand Patry
 François Piazza
 Simone Piuze
 Gilles Proulx
 Aimé Taillon
 Jean Guida

References

External links

1973 films
Films directed by Denis Héroux
Films shot in Montreal
1973 comedy films
Canadian comedy films
1970s French-language films
French-language Canadian films
1970s Canadian films